(born 1961) is a Japanese composer and mandolin musician. He studied mandolin under Masaki Kinoshita (木下正紀).

Biography
He lives in Osaka Prefecture. He is a technological adviser at Baika Women's University mandolin club.

Original compositions
 Two motivations (2つの動機) (motifs) (1982)
 Prelude 2 (プレリュード2) (1989)
 Overture (序曲) (1991)
 3 Dimensions (1996)
 Prelude 3 (プレリュード3) (1999)
 EX-trance (2000)
 With You (2001)
 The Wings of Dreams (夢のつばさ) (2003)
 Melody (メロディ) (2004)
 Symphonic Prelude (交響的前奏曲) (2007)
 Silent Song (無言歌) (2008)
 "Access" for the Mandolin Orchestra (マンドリンオーケストラのための"Access") (2009)
 Prelude 4 (プレリュード4) (2009)
 Variations (変奏曲) (2010)
 Three Songs (3つのうた) (2010)
 Casual Life (2010)
 Sea lyric (海の抒情詩) (2011)
 For the children of the future (未来の子供達の為に) (2012)
 Nocturne (Nocturne) (夜想曲(ノクターン)) (2013)
 Imagine ~ To the other side of the sky ~ (Imagine 〜空の向こうのあなたへ〜) (2014)
 I will devote myself to Sene in the mountains (山中の瀬音に身をゆだね) (2014)
 Time Traveler (時の旅人) (2014)
 Fantasia (2015)
 Celebration Overture (祝典序曲), guitar ensemble (祝典序曲) (2019)
 "Access" for a guitar ensemble (ギター合奏のための"Access"), mandolin duo, (2009)
 New Life (1996)
 Campus Life (2003)
 Flexible (2005)
 Prelude 2 for Duo (2008) e

Arrangements
Main arrangement works
Howl's Moving Castle (composed by Yumi Kimura / Joe Hisaishi)
The Wind of Life (Composed by Joe Hisaishi)
With feelings in the four seasons of Japan (Araki Toyohisa et al. Composition)
To the world of period drama (you composer Shunsuke Kikuchi)
Furutahata Shinsaburo is back! (Composed by Yusuke Honma)
Farewell song (composed by F. Chopin)
So I'm an anime girl! (Koji Makaino composer)
Passover (composed by Joe Hisaishi)
Dear WOMAN (composed by Hirata Shoichiro, co-arrangement with Akoshi Mari)
Ponyo on the cliff (composed by Joe Hisaishi, co-arrangement with Maru Akoshi)
Michi ~ Gelsomina (composed by Nino Rota)
Beyond the Sunset (Composed by Taro Hakase and Yoshihiko Ishizaka)
Etopyrika (composed by Taro Hakase)
So I can not stop anime! (Yoshino Konno and others composer)
I gotta meet Johnnys! (Koji Makaino composer)
String Quartet, 1st Movement (composed by Claude A. Debussy)
From "Monster Hunter" "The Proof of Heroes" (Composed by Masato Koda)
Record award medley (Composition by Kobayashi A star and others
Beyond the hill (composed by Masao Koga)
Tamashii Revolution (composed by Chiho Ochi)
A bouquet with love (Koichi Taho Composition)
Airship (composed by Miyuki Nakajima)
Hot-blooded period drama medley (Hirao Masatoshi et al. Composition
Record Grand Prix Medley 2
Alara's spell (composed by Okamoto Mayo)

References

External links
Video, Overture (序曲), composed by Hidenori Yoshimizu, performed by ARSNOVA Mandolin Orchestra

1961 births
Japanese classical composers
Japanese classical mandolinists
Japanese male classical composers
Living people